Silver Scooter / Cursive is a split EP by the bands Silver Scooter and Cursive. It was released in 1998 in a 10" vinyl format on Crank! Records and later re-released on CD on May 5, 1999. Silver Scooter's songs were produced by the band and Dave McNair, while Cursive's songs were produced by A.J. Mogis.

Track listing

References

Cursive (band) EPs
Split EPs
1999 EPs